Eugène Hubert (Sury-en-Vaux, 1846–19?) was a 19th-century French journalist and playwright.

Graduated in law, he became a banker and later decided to devote himself to journalism and literature. His plays were presented at Théâtre du Château-d'Eau and Théâtre des Bouffes-Parisiens.

Works 
1872: Les Actrices de Paris, quatrains, with Christian de Trogoff
1876: Revendication, three-act drama, with de Trogoff
1878: Populus, drama in 5 acts and 8 tableaux, including a prologue, with Ulric de Fonvielle and Christian de Trogoff
1879: Le loup de Kevergan, drama in five acts and tableaux, with Émile Rochard
1879: Péchés de jeunesse, poems
1898: Ninette, three-act opéra comique, with Charles Clairville and de Trogoff

19th-century French dramatists and playwrights
19th-century French journalists
French male journalists
1846 births
People from Cher (department)
Year of death missing
19th-century French male writers